Lausnitz (official name: Lausnitz bei Neustadt an der Orla) is a municipality in the district Saale-Orla-Kreis, in Thuringia, Germany. It lies 4 km west of Neustadt an der Orla.

References

Saale-Orla-Kreis